Swami Haridhos Giri (also Haridas Giri), affectionately called Guruji, was born in the month of Margazhi (December-January) in the Tamil calendar with the birth star of Utharattathi. Giri was born in the village of Thennangur, Tamil Nadu, South India.

Biography
Swami Haridhos Giri was instrumental in spreading Dakshina Sampradaya Namasankeertanam in India. Giri had traveled to many countries; giving many speeches and singing bhajans of Dakshina Bharatha Sampradaya. He is the Chief Disciple of Swami Gnanananda Giri. He devoted his entire life to serve his guru, Swami Gnanananda Giri. During his time, he established spiritual haven in Thennangur-Dakshina Halasyam in South India. Swami Haridhos Giri built the Panduranga Temple, dedicated to Vitthala, a manifestation of the deity Vishnu, shrine of his beloved guru Swami Gnanananda Giri and also has built cottages for devotees to stay, temples, and canteens. Swami Haridhos Giri built the place within 14 years.

He traveled all over the world including Singapore, Malaysia and other countries to spread Namasankeerthanam, as he was instructed by his guru Swami Gnanananda Giri. He has thousands of devotees all over the world.

Death/"Disappearance"
On September 4th 1994 in Koteswar, Haridhos Giri took to Jalasamadhi (religious death in water) in the Alaknanda river in full consciousness in front of his devotees, He was later swept away by the currents of the river and was not found. There is a Hindu temple dedicated to Koteswar Mahadev in Koteswar. Swami Gnanananda Giri, Principal Disciple of Swami Haridhos Giri built a bhajan platform in memory of Swami Haridhos Giri.Swami Haridhos Giri disappeared on September 4, 1994 and has not been seen since.

References

External links 

Haridhos Giri, the chief disciple of Swami Gnanananda Giri
Sri Gnanananda Nama Sankirtana Mandali of Malaysia The message Sri Haridhos Giri/ Chief Disciple of Swami Gnanananda Giri got from the Swamji Gnananada Giri is: "When people praise you many do not become egoistic, but ignore them in all humility. And do not be worried about the insults thrown at you likewise. Then you will settle down well". This is equally a message to us all to see such a Great Guru is to know Him: "To know Him is to know God, for God and Guru are one and the same".
Swami Haridhos Giri Seva Samajam/ Ashram(Malaysia) of Chief Disciple of Swami Gnanananda Giri "After many years, he got off his Samadhi, came back to the mutt and made Sri Gnanananda Giri Swami as the “Peedathipathi”. After that the great saint renounced the world and became one with god." said Swamji Nama Nanda Giri/Chief Disciple of Sri Haridhos Giri

Photo gallery

1990s missing person cases
20th-century Hindu philosophers and theologians
20th-century Indian philosophers
Advaitin philosophers
Indian Hindu monks
Missing person cases in India
Ontologists
Sanskrit writers
Year of birth missing